The Chicago/Midwest Emmy Awards are Regional Emmy awards presented by the Chicago / Midwest chapter of the National Academy of Television Arts & Sciences (NATAS). The chapter was founded in 1958, and serves the Chicago metropolitan area and the surrounding parts of Illinois, Indiana and Wisconsin.

References

External links
National Academy of Television Arts & Sciences, Chicago/Midwest Chapter — official website
Chicago / Midwest Emmy Awards Recipients and Nominees— list of past nominees and winners since 1958

Regional Emmy Awards
Awards established in 1958
1958 establishments in the United States